The Russian House — Russian Centre of Science and Culture in Belgrade is a centre aimed to promote Russian language and culture, it is one of 44 present Russian Cultural Centers worldwide.

Establishment of the Russian Center is strongly connected to Russian emigrants in the Kingdom of Yugoslavia, after 1917 October Revolution. Idea for establishment comes from these emigrants, and it has been affirmed by King Alexander, Serbian Patriarch Varnava, Aleksandar Belić and other famous persons from Serbia.

Center is finished by the project of Vasily Baumgarten, talented Russian architect. It is opened as cultural center on 9 April 1933. Today, it is reputable as one of the most beautiful locations in Belgrade.

In the post World War II period, Center is turned to the Home of Soviet Culture. Since 1994 to present it's called Russian Center of Science and Culture — The Russian House.

References

External links  
 
 Russian Center on the official  website of Serbian Government

Russia–Serbia relations
Tourist attractions in Belgrade
Buildings and structures in Belgrade
Russian language
Russian Cultural Centers
Soviet Union–Yugoslavia relations
Russian diaspora in Serbia